Jonathan Spyer is a British-Israeli analyst, writer, and journalist of Middle Eastern affairs. He is a fellow at the Jerusalem Institute for Strategy and Security and the Middle East Forum, a freelance security analyst and correspondent for Jane's Information Group, and a columnist for The Jerusalem Post.

Spyer is the author of Days of the Fall: A Reporter's Journey in the Syria and Iraq Wars (Routledge, 2017), based on his numerous trips to Syria and Iraq, and The Transforming Fire: The Rise of the Israel-Islamist Conflict (Bloomsbury, 2010).

Bio
Spyer was raised in London. He is of Russian Jewish and Central Asian heritage. Spyer immigrated to Israel from Britain in 1991. He earned a PhD in International Relations from the London School of Economics and a master's degree in Middle East Politics from the School of Oriental and African Studies (SOAS) in London. From 1992 to 1993, he served in the 188th Armored Brigade of the Israel Defense Forces and fought in the 2006 Lebanon War as a reservist. During that war, Spyer narrowly escaped death when his tank was hit by two Kornet missiles, while deployed in a valley beneath the town of Al-Khiam.

Spyer resides in Jerusalem.

In September, 2020, Spyer revealed that he had been banned from travel to the USA, on the grounds of Section 212 of the US Immigration and Nationality Act 'which prohibits issuance of a visa to a person who at any time engaged in terrorist activities or was associated with a terrorist organization.' Spyer wrote of his suspicion that his acquaintance with senior officials of the PKK might have been the cause. '  The ban was subsequently rescinded.

Career

Spyer is a freelance security analyst and correspondent for Jane's Information Group, a fellow at the Jerusalem Institute for Strategy and Security and the Middle East Forum, and a columnist for The Jerusalem Post.

In the 2010s, Spyer traveled to Syria and Iraq numerous times, generally for around two-week periods. He spent about half the time of his trips in Kurdish-held areas. These experiences were the basis for Spyer's 2017 book, Days of the Fall: A Reporter’s Journey in the Syria and Iraq Wars, published by Routledge.

In October 2014, Spyer revealed evidence of possession and use of chemical weapons, likely mustard gas, by the Islamic State in Iraq and Syria (ISIS), in northern Syria. In June, 2015, Spyer traveled with the Iraqi Shia militia Ktaeb Hizballah in Iraq's Anbar Province and observed the militia in action against Islamic State forces. He also interviewed the movement's leader Abu Mahdi al-Muhandis at this time. In April 2017, Spyer traveled to regime-controlled Syria under his British passport as part of a government-sponsored media tour. On that trip, he posed as a British supporter of the Syrian government, interviewed Syrian government ministers and was photographed with Syrian Minister of Reconciliation Ali Haidar and Minister of Information, Mohammed Tourjeman. In January 2018, Al Arabiya reported that Syrian President Bashar al-Assad fired Tourjeman for permitting Spyer, an Israeli, entry into the country.

Spyer's reporting and analysis of Middle Eastern affairs has been published in numerous outlets including The Wall Street Journal, The Guardian, The Times, The Weekly Standard, Foreign Policy, and The American Interest.

Books

References

External links
 

Living people
English emigrants to Israel
Alumni of the London School of Economics
Alumni of SOAS University of London
Israeli non-fiction writers
English non-fiction writers
Year of birth missing (living people)